Paul Sishir Sarker is a Bangladeshi Protestant bishop. Since 2007, he has been the Moderator of the Church of Bangladesh, a united Protestant Church that holds membership in the World Communion of Reformed Churches and the Anglican Communion.

Ecclesiastical career
Sarker was raised as a high-church Anglican. He originally studied at the University of Dhaka, with the purpose of becoming a Bengali Literature teacher. He felt the call to ministry at university and he decided to pursue religious studies after finishing his degree. He first studied at the Bishop's College, in Calcutta, India, later moving to the United States, where he earned a M. Div. degree at Louisville Presbyterian Seminary, in Kentucky. After being ordained an Anglican priest, he was elected bishop of the Church of Bangladesh in 2002, and consecrated Bishop in the Diocese of Kushtia, on 5 January 2003. He was elected Moderator of the Church of Bangladesh in 2007, and translated to the Diocese of Dhaka, in October 2009, upon the retirement of the titular bishop, Michael Baroi.

Sarker attended an Anglican Church in North America meeting on 13–15 May 2017, at Holy Cross Cathedral, in Loganville, Georgia, where he and Archbishop Foley Beach, of the ACNA, signed "A Joint Statement on Communion from the Primate of Bangladesh and the Primate of the Anglican Church", to affirm and celebrate the communion between both churches. The Church of Bangladesh was the first united province of the Anglican Communion to declare full communion with the ACNA.

References

External links
 Paul Sarker Biography, Anglican Ink, 2 January 2016

Living people
Bangladeshi Anglicans
Evangelical Anglican bishops
21st-century Anglican bishops in Asia
21st-century Anglican archbishops
Year of birth missing (living people)
21st-century Calvinist and Reformed ministers
Anglican bishops of Dhaka
Anglican bishops of Kushtia